exo-Norborneol is an alcohol containing the norbornane skeleton. Commercially available, this colorless compound may be prepared by the reaction of norbornene with formic acid, followed by hydrolysis of the resultant exo-norbornyl formate.

See also
 Endo-Norborneol

References

Further reading
 Reaction of organic compounds under high temperature – dilute acid (HTDA) conditions. III. The perdeuteration of bicyclo[2.2.1]heptanes PDF
 

Secondary alcohols
Cyclopentanes